Antanas Smetona (10 August 1874 – 9 January 1944) was a Lithuanian intellectual and journalist and the first President of Lithuania from 1919 to 1920 and again from 1926 to 1940, before its occupation by the Soviet Union. He was one of the most important Lithuanian political figures between World War I and World War II, and was one of the most prominent ideologists of nationalism in Lithuania.

Early life and education
Researcher Kazimieras Gasparavičius has traced Smetona's patrilineal ancestry to Laurentijus who was born around 1695 and lived near Raguva. Smetona was the eighth of nine children. His parents were hardworking people who managed to double their inherited . His father was literate and Smetona learned to read at home.

His father died in 1885 when Smetona was only 11 years old and, despite financial difficulties, a year later Smetona – the only of his siblings – was sent to the primary school in Taujėnai where instruction was in Russian due to the Lithuanian press ban. This was his dying father's request. His mother hoped that Smetona would become a priest. After graduation in 1889, Smetona wanted to continue his education, but gymnasiums admitted pupils only up to the age of 12 and he was already 15 years old. Therefore, he was forced to study privately in Ukmergė in order to catch up and be able to pass examinations to enter the fourth class of gymnasium. In summer 1891, he attempted to gain admission to the Liepāja Gymnasium as his brother Motiejus worked in a factory in Liepāja. He was refused and instead applied to the Palanga Pre-Gymnasium, which had no age restrictions. Smetona was an exemplary student (one of the top two students) and received a tuition waiver. As a superintendent of a student dormitory, he also received free housing and was able to support himself by providing private lessons. Three other future signatories of the Act of Independence of Lithuania attended the Pro-Gymnasium at the same time: Steponas Kairys, Jurgis Šaulys, and Kazimieras Steponas Šaulys. As Palanga was close to East Prussia, it was easier to obtain Lithuanian literature, which was banned by the Tsarist authorities. Smetona began reading Lithuanian periodicals and books, including a history of Lithuania by Maironis.

After graduation in 1893, according to his family's wishes, he passed his entrance examinations for the Samogitian Diocesan Seminary in Kaunas. However, he felt no great calling for priesthood and enrolled at the Jelgava Gymnasium in Latvia. This was a cultural hub of the Lithuanian National Revival and attracted many future leaders in Lithuanian culture and politics, including Juozas Tūbelis and Vladas Mironas who later became Smetona's political companions. In particular, Lithuanian language and culture was openly promoted by the linguist, Jonas Jablonskis, teacher of Greek, with whom Smetona developed a close professional relationship. Jablonskis visited Smetona's native village collecting data on Lithuanian dialects. Smetona met his future wife, Sofija Chodakauskaitė, through Jablonskis who recommended him as tutor for her brother.

In fall 1896, the administration of the Jelgava Gymnasium forced the Lithuanian students to recite their prayers in Russian while Latvian and German students were allowed to use their native languages. Smetona and other students refused and were expelled. Most later agreed to pray in Russian and were re-admitted, but a handful who refused were prohibited from attending any other school. The students sent petitions to Pope Leo XIII and Ivan Delyanov, Minister of National Education. Smetona and two others,  and Petras Vaiciuška, managed to secure an audience with Delyanov who allowed the Lithuanians to pray in Latin and the expelled students to continue their education. Smetona did not return to Jelgava and finished up at Gymnasium No. 9 in Saint Petersburg.

Upon graduation in 1897, Smetona entered the Faculty of Law of the University of Saint Petersburg. He was more interested in history and languages, but knew that as a Catholic his choices were limited to priest, lawyer, or doctor if he wanted to work in Lithuania. Saint Petersburg, with a direct railway connection to Lithuania, was becoming a Lithuanian cultural center. Smetona joined and chaired a secret Lithuanian student organization; he was later succeeded by Steponas Kairys. He also joined a Lithuanian choir led by Česlovas Sasnauskas, organist at the Church of St. Catherine. Smetona was exposed to socialist ideas and even read Marx's Capital, but resolutely rejected them. He was expelled from the university, imprisoned for two weeks, and deported to Vilnius for participating in the February 1899 student protests. It was the first time Smetona visited the city, the historical capital of the Grand Duchy of Lithuania, and it left a deep impression on him. A month later, he was allowed to return to the university.

In 1898, Smetona and his roommate, using a mimeograph printed about 100 copies of a brief Lithuanian grammar written by Petras Avižonis based on the German-language writings of Friedrich Kurschat. This grammar was insufficient for Lithuanian needs and in summer 1900 Jonas Jablonskis set out to work on his Lithuanian grammar. He was assisted by Avižonis, Žemaitė, and Smetona, though Smetona mostly edited works of Bishop Motiejus Valančius. The grammar was published in 1901 and became a fundamental work in establishing the standard Lithuanian language. In early 1902, the police began investigating a network of Lithuanian book smugglers and raided Smetona's room where they found several prohibited Lithuanian publications. He was imprisoned in the Vyborg Castle, but managed to secure acquittal and graduate that spring.

Early activities
After his graduation from the university in 1902, he moved to Vilnius and worked at the Vilnius Land Bank until 1915. He became an active participant in Lithuanian cultural life and, up until becoming president in December 1926, devoted substantial amounts of time and effort to the Lithuanian press. Two years later, he married Sofija Chodakauskaitė in the Church of St. Raphael the Archangel in Vilnius.

From his very first days in Vilnius, Smetona became involved in the activities of various Lithuanian nationalist groups, and joined the Lithuanian Democratic Party, which he represented in the Great Seimas of Vilnius. He was later elected to its Presidium. In 1904 and 1907, he was on the staff of the Lithuanian newspaper, Vilniaus žinios (The Vilnius News). In 1905–1906, he edited the weekly Lietuvos ūkininkas (The Lithuanian Farmer). In 1907, Smetona and the Rev. Juozas Tumas-Vaižgantas established a venture to print the newspaper Viltis (The Hope), and started publishing and circulating it. In Viltis, Smetona advocated national unity. He was also one of the incorporators of the Aušra (Dawn) company for the publishing of Lithuanian books, a member of the Lithuanian Mutual Aid Society of Vilnius, the Lithuanian Learned Society, the Vilniaus aušra (The Dawn of Vilnius), and Rytas (The Morning) education societies, the Rūta Art Society and many other societies, and taught the Lithuanian language at Vilnius schools. In 1914, he started publishing Vairas (The Rudder), a new bi-weekly magazine.

Politics

During the First World War, he was the first vice-chairman, and later chairman, of the Central Committee of the Lithuanian Society for the Relief of War Sufferers. In the summer of 1916, Antanas Smetona, together with other Lithuanians from Vilnius, presented a memorandum to the German Commander-in-Chief of the Eastern Front, in which they demanded the right of the Lithuanian nation to have an independent State. On 6 September 1917, he started printing the newspaper, Lietuvos Aidas (Lithuania's Echo), working as its publisher and its editor-in-chief. In the first issue of the newspaper, Smetona wrote that the most important goal of the Lithuanian nation was the re-establishment of an independent Lithuanian state.

Between 18 and 22 September 1917, he participated in the Lithuanian Conference in Vilnius, and was elected chairman (1917–1919) of the Council of Lithuania (later Council of the State). On 16 February 1918, Antanas Smetona signed the Act of Independence of Lithuania.

Between December 1918 and March 1919, he lived primarily in Germany and the Scandinavian countries, soliciting loans for the cause of Lithuanian independence. On 4 April 1919, the State Council of Lithuania elected Smetona the first president of the Republic of Lithuania. On 19 April 1920, the Constituent Assembly elected Aleksandras Stulginskis President. Not re-elected to the Seimas, from 1921 to 1924, he edited several periodicals, including Lietuvos balsas (Voice of Lithuania), Lietuviškas balsas (Lithuanian Voice) and Vairas.

After the Klaipėda Revolt of January 1923, in the Memelland, which had been separated from Germany, he was made commissioner there on 20 February, but, due to disagreements with Prime Minister Ernestas Galvanauskas, he resigned from his post.

In November 1923, authorities imprisoned Smetona for several days for publishing an article by Augustinas Voldemaras in Vairas. Between 1923 and 1927, he was an assistant professor at the University of Lithuania – at first in the chair of art theory and history and later at the department of philosophy. He lectured on ethics, ancient philosophy and Lithuanian linguistics. In 1932, he was awarded an honorary Ph.D. at the Vytautas Magnus University.

Smetona participated in the activity of the Lithuanian Riflemen's Union that had staged the Klaipėda Revolt, which gave him greater name-recognition. More than once, he was elected to its central board. Between 1924 and 1940, he was the vice-chairman of the board of the International Bank.

Authoritarian president

Smetona was one of the leaders of the coup d'état of 1926, which deposed President Kazys Grinius. He once again became president on 19 December of that year (two others briefly held the office during the coup, which began on 17 December, before Smetona was formally restored to the presidency). He designated Augustinas Voldemaras as prime minister. One year later, he suppressed the parliament and, on 15 May 1928, with the approval of the government, he promulgated a new constitution with more extensive presidential powers. In 1929, he removed Voldemaras and assumed dictatorial powers.

For the next nine years, Smetona ruled by decree, without a parliament; his new constitution vested him with both executive and legislative powers when the Seimas was not in session. He was re-elected President in 1931 and 1938, both times as the only candidate. The Seimas was not reconvened until 1936; even then, it was composed entirely of Smetona's adherents. In 1938, a third constitution was enacted that retained the general authoritarian character of the 1928 document, and declared that political power in the state was "indivisible." He remained in office until 15 June 1940.

As a nationalist, Smetona's regime closed many Polish-language schools upon coming to power. The regime repeatedly arrested and imprisoned members of the already-banned Communist Party – as with almost all interwar European dictatorships, the claimed threat of Communism was the source of its legitimacy and the regime executed the original leadership five days after coming to power. However, despite propaganda that Communists were a "non-Lithuanian force invading the country", they continued to operate underground with growing membership and it is known today that their leaders were ethnically Lithuanian.

In 1935, Smetona suffered a blow when farmers in south-east Lithuania organised a strike and refused to sell their products. Reprisals led to five deaths and 456 farmers being arrested. This exacerbated long-standing tensions within his regime between hardliners arguing for more rigid authoritarian control over Lithuanian life, and moderates who wanted liberalisation. These difficulties, however, were already becoming overshadowed by the threat of Nazi Germany. Smetona's regime was the first in Europe to put Nazis on trial: as early as 8 February 1934, action had begun against Nazis in the Memel region, which was autonomous within Lithuania. The Smetona regime's trial of Ernst Neumann and Freiherr von Sass (July 1934 to March 1935) was the first attempt anywhere to bring Nazis to justice, and saw 76 Hitlerites imprisoned and four sentenced to death – though this was commuted to life imprisonment. By 1938, however, Memel was becoming a difficult issue for a regime spending a quarter of its budget on defence and expensive army modernisation, and the Nazis were able to win 26 of 29 seats in elections. The following year, Smetona surrendered Memel to Hitler and declared a state of emergency – he never lost his distaste for Hitler and Nazism, having been so discredited by the loss of Memel that members of the Lithuanian political opposition were appointed to his cabinet to try recovering credibility and domestic stability.

Smetona's government was cautious about industrialisation, as its support base lay in the dominant rural population. As dictator, Smetona did nothing to encourage direct foreign investment, which remained extremely limited throughout his rule. Nonetheless, during Smetona's dictatorship, Lithuania did advance economically: industrial output – mainly directed to domestic demand – when he was overthrown by the Soviet invasion was twice what it had been before the coup that brought him to power, and the country's transport network had been greatly improved by the construction of railways from Šiauliai to Klaipėda and from Kaunas to the south and north-east. In contrast, Smetona was more generous in support for the agricultural sector, which at the time provided almost all of Lithuania's exports despite occasionally protesting against the regime.

Soviet occupation
Lithuania was occupied by Soviet troops in 1940, as a consequence of the 1939 Molotov–Ribbentrop Pact between Nazi Germany and the Soviet Union. After the USSR presented an ultimatum to Lithuania in June of that year, Smetona proposed armed resistance against the Soviets. The majority of the government and the commanders of the army did not concur, believing that the country was not capable of effective resistance with Soviet troops stationed inside Lithuania. On 15 June, Smetona turned his presidential duties to Prime Minister Antanas Merkys on an interim basis according to the constitution. Before leaving the Presidential Palace in Kaunas, Smetona said: "I do not want to make Lithuania a bolshevik country with my own hands." He believed that by leaving the country, he would be in a position to do more for the country's sake by leading a government in exile instead of becoming a Soviet marionette. He firstly fled to Germany with his family. Shortly afterwards, the Smetonas fled to Switzerland.

A day after Smetona left the country, Merkys announced he had deposed Smetona and was now president in his own right. Two days later, Merkys was pressured into appointing the more pliant Justas Paleckis as prime minister and resigning himself. Paleckis then became acting president, and was used as a puppet to oversee the final stages of Lithuania being incorporated into the Soviet Union a month later. 

Since Lithuania declared independence from the Soviet Union in 1990, it has taken the position that Merkys' takeover of the presidency was illegal and unconstitutional, since Smetona never formally resigned. Lithuanian officials thus do not recognize Merkys or Paleckis as legitimate presidents, and contend that all subsequent actions leading up to the Soviet annexation were ipso facto void.

Flight abroad

On the morning of 15 June, just after the government decided to accept the Soviet ultimatum, Smetona began making hasty preparations for fleeing the country. He was accompanied by his wife, his son and daughter and their spouses and children, Kazys Musteikis, former Minister of Defense, and two presidential adjutants. Smetona departed Kaunas at about 3 pm that day. They stopped in Kybartai on the border with Nazi Germany. Smetona and Musteikis attempted to summon the 9th Infantry Regiment from Marijampolė to protect them and to offer at least symbolic resistance to the Red Army, but the regiment was stopped by a delegation sent from Kaunas to retrieve the president. Smetona decided to cross the border without delay, but Lithuanian border guards would not allow him to pass. Around midnight, a local man led Smetona, his bodyguard and adjutant across the shallow Liepona stream. With Smetona already on the other side, his family managed to convince border guards to let them through at about 6 am.

There, he was carefully supervised and allowed to communicate only with a Lithuanian representative, Kazys Škirpa. The Germans did not allow him to make any political moves so as not to upset the Soviet Union. It was clear that Smetona's presence was not desirable. On 4 September, Smetona officially petitioned the Embassy of the United States in Berlin for U.S. visas. The request was granted, but only on the condition that, while Smetona was in the U.S., he would not be considered the leader or representative of any state or government. It was a humiliating condition, but Smetona accepted it and departed to Bern, Switzerland on 18 September. Musteikis stayed in Berlin.

In Bern, Smetona met with members of the Lithuanian Diplomatic Service, ambassadors and diplomats who continued to represent pre-occupation Lithuania. They hoped to establish a government-in-exile via the National Committee chaired by former prime minister Ernestas Galvanauskas. Smetona saw no need for such a committee and criticized the choice of Galvanauskas. The diplomats were also not receptive to Smetona – he had no funds, authority or political influence. Nevertheless, Smetona signed the so-called Kybartai Act – a backdated document supposedly written in Kybartai before his exile. The Act dismissed Antanas Merkys and appointed Stasys Lozoraitis as both prime minister and acting president. This controversial document was never used in practice.

Smetona departed Bern for Lisbon in January 1941. He stayed in Monte Estoril, at the Pensão Zenith. He left for Brazil aboard the Serpa Pinto, arriving in Rio de Janeiro on 14 February. He was met by local officials and Lithuanian emigrants, and had a meeting with Getúlio Vargas, the president of Brazil. Smetona departed Brazil on 26 February. On 9 or 10 March 1941, Smetona with his wife arrived in New York aboard the SS Argentina. He was greeted by about 30 American journalists and photographers as well as Lithuanian-American representatives. He was escorted to The Pierre hotel, where an evening function with about 400 guests was held on 13 March. Since Smetona was a private individual in the United States, the gathering did not include any members of U.S. organizations.

They lived temporarily at the Embassy of Lithuania in Washington, D.C., but their relationship with the representative Povilas Žadeikis was tense. Smetona then lived in Pittsburgh and Chicago before settling in Cleveland, Ohio in May 1942 with his son's family. While in exile, he began work on a history of Lithuania and on his memoirs.

Death and burial 

As Smetona was busy on his writing, he paid little attention to the fact that the heating system in his son's house needed repair and was becoming dangerous. On October 28, 1943, Smetona wrote: The night before yesterday coal fumes made me dizzy. I could not think clearly. Now I have completely recovered.On January 9, 1944, a fire broke out in the house. Smetona's son Julius noticed the fire while on the first floor. Above him, in the attic suite, Smetona and his wife Sofija spotted the smoke seeping in under the door. Sofija opened the door and she and Smetona began descending the stairs. Sofija, choking from the smoke and flames, stopped when she realized her husband was not with her. Smetona, apparently deciding that he could not go outside without a coat – for he was recovering from the flu and was to give a talk in the coming weeks – without saying anything to his wife, returned to get a fur coat. It took just a few minutes for him to be overcome by the smoke. Julius tried to return into the burning building to save his father but was forced out by the smoke and fire. Smetona was found lying on the kitchen floor on the second floor of Julius' flat. He was not burned.

Firefighters took Smetona outside and he was rushed to hospital by ambulance. He died before arriving.

The official record stated that the fire was caused by an overheated furnace. Some believe, however, that due to Smetona's continued political activities, the fire was started by the Russian Intelligence Service (the NKGB at the time). With no evidence turning up in the subsequent years to substantiate that claim, it is, however, doubtful.

On January 13, 1944, the funeral of President Smetona took place at Cleveland's Cathedral of St. John the Evangelist. Bishop Edward F. Hoban officiated. Smetona was buried at Calvary Cemetery in Cleveland.

His wife Sofija died in Cleveland on December 28, 1968. 

The couple were survived by their daughter, Marija Danutė Smetonaitė (1905–1992), son Julius Rimgaudas Smetona (1913–1974) and Julius' sons, Anthony Algirdas Smetona (1939–2012), Juozas Smetona (1940–1996) and Vytautas Julius Smetona (born 1955).

In 1975, Smetona's remains were moved from Cleveland's Knollwood Cemetery mausoleum to a crypt (No. 103) next to his wife Sofija in Section 23 of All Souls Cemetery in Chardon, Ohio.

See also

 List of Lithuanian rulers
 Konstantin Päts
 Kārlis Ulmanis
 European interwar dictatorships

References

Bibliography

External links
 

1874 births
1944 deaths
People from Ukmergė District Municipality
People from Vilkomirsky Uyezd
Lithuanian Roman Catholics
Lithuanian Democratic Party politicians
Party of National Progress politicians
Lithuanian Nationalist Union politicians
Presidents of Lithuania
Members of the Council of Lithuania
Lithuanian independence activists
Leaders who took power by coup
Lithuanian jurists
Lithuanian writers
Saint Petersburg State University alumni
Lithuanian people of World War II
World War II political leaders
Lithuanian emigrants to the United States
Lithuanian exiles
Lithuanian nationalists
Exiled politicians
Lithuanian-American culture in Ohio
Grand Crosses of the Order of the Cross of Vytis
Recipients of the Order of the White Lion
Accidental deaths in Ohio
Deaths from fire in the United States
Burials in Ohio